Cullinane may refer to:

 Cullinane (name). including a list of people with the name
 Cullinane, Queensland, a locality in the Cassowary Coast Region, Australia
Cullinane Corporation (Cullinet), a former software company from Westwood, Massachusetts
Cullinane College, Wanganui, a college in New Zealand

See also
 Cullinane v McGuigan, a New Zealand case relating to breach of contract